SMU St. Aloysius Bandung, used to be affectionately called "TOP" or, in more recent years, "Aloy" is one of the premiere private high schools in Bandung, Indonesia.  It is part of the St. Aloysius school system, founded by Dutch priests as early as the 1860s in the city of Surabaya.

"TOP", is also its motto.  Originally the abbreviation for "Tot Onze Plezier" (or "To Our Pleasure" in English) to reflect the freethinking spirit of its founders, it was adapted to "Taruna Ogha Pravritti", a Sanskrit phrase meaning "The Youth Shall Persist".  Despite its Roman Catholic affiliation, it is open to students of all faiths.

History

The publication of Max Havelaar, written by a Dutch-Indonesian who saw firsthand the suffering of the Dutch colonial subjects in the plantations, started widespread interest in Europe to help improve the conditions of the colonies abroad including educational contributions.  Recognizing the absence of a Catholic school system in Indonesia, four priests were dispatched to Indonesia: Bruder Engelbertus Cranen, Bruder Felix, Bruder Anthonius and Bruder Stanislaus.

Upon arrival in Surabaya, they established their first school in 1862 by the name of "St. Yusuf".  In 1905, the expanded group on priests established "St. Hilarius" in Jakarta.  Shortly after, they also established schools in Semarang, Madiun, and several other cities in Java.  Finally in 1930 they established a monastery in Bandung on Jalan Sultan Agung, the present location of the school. In 1948 the priests established the St. Yusuf Primary School, and St. Aloysius Secondary Schools.

Initially a Jesuit all-boys school, the school is currently run by a non-profit Catholic charity instead of by the monastery, and has been co-educational since the early 1980s.

Recent years 

During the leadership of former head of the charity Fr. van Ipperen, St. Aloysius saw a period of rapid expansion in the 1980s and 1990s, both in terms of admissions and facilities.  It has campuses on Jalan Sultan Agung no.4 near the Dago area of Bandung, in the Sukajadi area north of the city center, and in Batununggal a newly established suburb in south of Bandung.  It also owns a retreat/recreational center in Gambung, some distance away from the city, to support its non-academic life experiences programs.  It boasts athletic facilities such as soccer fields,  swimming pools, basketball and volleyball courts, baseball fields; in addition to laboratory facilities for computer engineering, electrical engineering, biological and physical sciences.
The school hosts extracurricular clubs including SAMANTA (Outdoor Activities Club),TOP Drum & Bugle Corps (marching band club), Choir Club, TCC or TOP Computer Club, Science Club, Taekwondo Club, Wushu club, The Scout, KPM or Korps Palang Merah(Red-Cross Corps), Baseball and Softball team, Basketball team, ALPHA (Aloysius Photography) Club, and Paskibra/ Pasukan Pengibar Bendera (flag-ceremony team).

On 12 June 2011, IATOP and the school hold a mass cycling events attended by 500 participants, which then form the cycling community named TOP Cycle.

Alumni 
Following the 2009 reunion (Reuni Akbar TOP), the alumni association of SMA St. Aloysius Bandung (called Ikatan Alumni TOP (IATOP)) held their congress in November 2010 in Bandung, during which they elected their first chairman.

COVID-19 Pandemic 
Since the COVID-19 Pandemic, SMU St. Aloysius Bandung has been collaborating with Scola LMS for Student (created by Edukasi untuk Bangsa). Although this app has been helping throughout the COVID-19 Pandemic, there are some controversies regarding this collaboration.

Some of those controversies includes:

 Constant maintenance of the site which causes technical issues for some students
 Inefficient learning which is caused by low quality videos
 Errors in two-factor authentication resulting in log-in problems
 Faulty quiz system
 Clash of assignment schedules due to bad coordination from teachers

Thankfully, the Minister of Education and Culture, Nadiem Makarim has announced that face-to-face learning are scheduled to return in the first quarter of 2021.
Schools in Indonesia
Catholic schools in Indonesia
Schools in Bandung